The 1974 Florida gubernatorial election took place on November 5, 1974. Incumbent Democratic Governor Reubin Askew won re-election to a second term.

This was just the second time after 1956, and the first that the Governor of Florida was re-elected for the second four-year term. This was also the first time a candidate got over one million votes in a Florida governor election.

Primary elections 
Primary elections were held on September 10, 1974.

Democratic primary 
Incumbent Reubin O'Donovan Askew faced little opposition in the Democratic Party primary. Despite a challenge from his own Lieutenant Governor Thomas Burton Adams, Jr., Askew, a popular member of the New Southerner political generation, was renominated easily.

Candidates 
Thomas Burton Adams Jr., incumbent Lieutenant Governor
Reubin Askew, incumbent Governor
Ben Hill Griffin Jr., citrus magnate
Norman Bie, lawyer

Results 

J. H. Williams became Askew's running mate for second term.

Republican primary

Candidate 
 Jerry Thomas, former President of the Florida Senate, banker

Results

General election

Results

Williams, as he ran on the joint ticket, replaced Adams as Lieutenant Governor.

References

Bibliography
 
 

1974
Gubernatorial
Florida
Florida gubernatorial election